Phileine Says Sorry is a Dutch/American 2003 comedy-drama film directed by Robert Jan Westdijk. It is based on the novel Phileine zegt sorry by Ronald Giphart.

Plot
The story is about Phileine (Kim van Kooten) and her actor boyfriend Max (Michiel Huisman). He goes to New York City to improve his acting skills. Later on, without Max knowing it, Phileine also travels to New York.

On the plane, she meets an American couple, Fabian and Lena, who offer to bring her to Max's house. Fabian gives Phileine his phone number to call him during her stay for a tour. Inside Max's house, Phileine meets his friends: the bespectacled Jules, the sick Leonard, the Flemish Gulpje, the terrible Joanna and weatherman LT (Louis Theodore). That same evening, a welcome party is held, but because of all the new impressions, drinks, and fatigue, Phileine goes to bed early.

In the morning, she finds a note from Max that he had to leave early for rehearsal but that the two of them will have dinner together in the evening. Phileine goes to the living room and meets Gulpje. Soon, they decide to be best friends and have lunch. After lunch, Phileine calls Fabian for a tour. During that tour, Fabian gets a little bit too personal so she reminds him that he has a wife.

Max can’t make it to diner because his rehearsal runs out. Phileine spends that night with the friends of Max. Together with Gulpje, she stirs the group up because they both like to joke around at the expense of others.

On day two, Phileine attends the premiere of Romeo and Juliet. The play shows the sexual side of society, so it is played naked and shows sex and masturbation scenes. Part of the audience is so shocked that after the break, they call out their displeasure and leave the theater. Phileine is astonished but remains still in her seat until the end.

At the after party, she tries to obtain explanations about what had happened on stage. She asks Max and the director Reginald, but neither gives her an answer. She quarrels with Max but settles the matter later in a pub. The next day, she goes with Gulpje to the restaurant where the scene from “When Harry Met Sally" was filmed. Phileine and Gulpje get the attention of two men and they invite them to their table. They want to show off their tricks and begin gently with panting and moaning. Initially the men find it funny, but when Phileine and Gulpje start screaming, the whole thing gets embarrassing and they run out the restaurant.

A little later the women run into Jules and start a conversation about sexual harassment from men. After an insulting remark by Phileine, Jules departs. Only then does she discover that Jules is not female but male. Phileine goes to meet LT, the boyfriend of 'terrible Joanna', on his boat on the water. They have sex in 'revenge' for the escapade between Joanna and Max on stage.

The next day, they decide to go to the last performance of the show. From the back of the theater, they see that Max is about to penetrate Joanna on stage. This time, Phileine will not let this happen and makes a huge scene by disrupting the play. Max tries to defend his action by explaining it as art. Phileine doesn’t accept this and gets the audience on her side in the argument.

The day after, the newspapers are filled with what happened in the theater and Phileine is requested for a number of TV shows. She goes to David Letterman's show where she takes control over the show and wins the support of the audience. She is provided with money so she can stay the night in a hotel. The next day, Max is at her door to take her to an AIDS Gala of his friend Leonard. She doesn’t want to go with him, so he lifts her up over his shoulder and takes her to a taxi.

The atmosphere between Phileine and the other people is hostile at the Gala. Except for Gulpje, Phileine has offended everybody else. Even Max is furious at her because he finds out she has slept with LT. Eventually Phileine realizes why everyone is mad at her. She gets on the stage and delivers a speech in which she says sorry for the first time in her life to everyone who she has treated rudely. She ends the speech with: "Sorry that I exist."

Cast
 Kim van Kooten - Phileine
 Michiel Huisman - Max
 Hadewych Minis - Gulpje
 Tara Elders - Lala
 Kenan Raven - LT
 Mads Wittermans - Christiaan
 Leona Philippo - Joanna
 Liesbeth Kamerling - Fleur
 Roeland Fernhout - Jules
 Dan Trettel - Cashier

External links 
  (in Dutch)
 

2003 films
2003 romantic comedy-drama films
2000s Dutch-language films
2000s English-language films
Films based on Dutch novels
Films set in the Netherlands
Films set in the United States
Dutch romantic comedy-drama films
2003 comedy films
2003 drama films
2003 multilingual films
Dutch multilingual films